Charles, duc d'Orléans may refer to:

 Charles I de Valois, Duke of Orléans (1394–1465)
 Charles II de Valois, Duke of Orléans (1522–1545), son of king Francis I of France
 Charles Maximilien de Valois, Duc d'Orléans, later Charles IX of France (1550–1574)